Trachystylis is a genus of flowering plants belonging to the family Cyperaceae.

Its native range is Australia (Queensland).

Species:
 Trachystylis stradbrokensis (Domin) Kük.

References

Cyperaceae
Cyperaceae genera